Granuliterebra is a genus of sea snails, marine gastropod molluscs in the family Terebridae, the auger snails.

Species
Species within the genus Granuliterebra include:
 Granuliterebra bathyrhaphe (Smith, 1875)
 Granuliterebra constricta (Thiele, 1925)
 Granuliterebra eddunhami Terryn & Holford, 2008
 Granuliterebra oliverai Terryn & Holford, 2008
 Granuliterebra palawanensis (Aubry & Picardal, 2011)
 Granuliterebra persica (Smith, 1877)
 Species brought into synonymy
 Granuliterebra castigata (A.H. Cooke, 1885): synonym of Hastulopsis castigata (A. H. Cooke, 1885)
 Granuliterebra tokunagai Oyama & Takemura, 1961: synonym of Granuliterebra tricincta (Smith, 1877)
 Granuliterebra tricincta Smith, 1877: synonym of Duplicaria tricincta (E. A. Smith, 1877)

References

 Oyama K. (1961). On some new facts of the taxonomy of Terebridae. Venus. 21(2): 176-189
 Terryn Y. (2007). Terebridae: A Collectors Guide. Conchbooks & NaturalArt. 59pp + plates. 
 Terryn Y. & Holford M. (2008) The Terebridae of Vanuatu with a revision of the genus Granuliterebra, Oyama 1961. Visaya Supplement 3: 1-96

External links
 Fedosov, A. E.; Malcolm, G.; Terryn, Y.; Gorson, J.; Modica, M. V.; Holford, M.; Puillandre, N. (2020). Phylogenetic classification of the family Terebridae (Neogastropoda: Conoidea). Journal of Molluscan Studies. 85(4): 359-388

Terebridae